The Spinning Ball (German: Die rollende Kugel) is a 1919 German silent drama film directed by Rudolf Biebrach and starring Ernst Hofmann, Olga Limburg and Martha Angerstein-Licho. It is an adaptation of the 1866 novel The Gambler by Fyodor Dostoevsky.

It was shot at the Tempelhof Studios in Berlin.

Cast
Ernst Hofmann as Vanja 
Martha Angerstein-Licho as Pauline Sagorianskij 
Rudolf Biebrach as General Sagorianskij 
Olga Limburg as Blanche 
Georg H. Schnell as Marquis de Grillet

References

Bibliography
Bock, Hans-Michael & Töteberg, Michael. Das Ufa-Buch. Zweitausendeins, 1992.

External links

Films of the Weimar Republic
German silent feature films
Films directed by Rudolf Biebrach
UFA GmbH films
German black-and-white films
German drama films
1919 drama films
Films shot at Tempelhof Studios
Films based on The Gambler
Films set in Germany
Films set in the 1860s
Silent drama films
1910s German films
1910s German-language films